Allonnes is a commune in the Maine-et-Loire department in western France. The village is located North of the town of Saumur, and the small river Authion passes through it.

In 2018, Allonnes had 3003 inhabitants, a slight increase (0,77%) compared to 2013.

Population

See also
Communes of the Maine-et-Loire department

References

External links

Official site

Communes of Maine-et-Loire